Louise Ann Miller (born 9 March 1960) is a retired female high jumper from England, who set her personal best (1.94 metres) in 1980.

Miller was born in Saffron Walden, Essex. She competed for Great Britain at the 1980 Summer Olympics, finishing in 11th place (1.85 m) in the overall-rankings.

References

 sports-reference

1960 births
Living people
British female high jumpers
English female high jumpers
Athletes (track and field) at the 1980 Summer Olympics
Olympic athletes of Great Britain
People from Saffron Walden